A general election was held in the U.S. state of Iowa on November 3, 2020. 

To vote by mail, registered Iowa voters must request a ballot by October 24, 2020. As of early October some 686,870 voters have requested mail ballots.

State offices

State Senate

25 out of the 50 seats in the Iowa Senate, the even-numbered districts, were up for election. Out of the contested seats, the Republican Party won 19 districts and the Democratic Party won 6 districts. The resulting composition was 32 Republicans and 18 Democrats. The Republicans gained the 42nd district while the Democrats gained the 22nd district, resulting in no net seat change.

State House of Representatives

All 100 seats in the Iowa House of Representatives were up for election. Republicans won 59 seats and Democrats won 41 seats. Republicans gained 6 seats.

State Supreme Court
4 out of the 7 justices in the Iowa Supreme Court were up for retention election for a new term of up to 8 years.

State Court of Appeals
4 out of the 9 judges in the Iowa Court of Appeals were up for retention election for a new term of up to 6 years.

Federal offices

President and vice president of the United States

Iowa had 6 electoral votes in the Electoral College. Republican Donald Trump won all of them with 53% of the popular vote.

U.S. Senate

One of the two United States Senators of Iowa was up for election. Incumbent Republican Joni Ernst won re-election with 52% of the votes.

U.S. House of Representatives

All 4 of Iowa's representatives in the United States House of Representatives were up for election. Republicans won 3 seats and Democrats won 1 seat. The Republicans gained two seats, the 1st and 2nd districts.

Ballot measure

Constitutional Convention Question (2020)

See also
 Elections in Iowa
 Politics of Iowa
 Political party strength in Iowa

References

External links
  (State affiliate of the U.S. League of Women Voters)
 
 
 

 
Iowa